Jersey Boys is a musical based on the songs of the Four Seasons.

Jersey Boy or Jersey Boys may also refer to:

People
Enzo Amore and Colin Cassady, a professional wrestling tag team known as "The Jersey Boys"

Film
Jersey Boys (film), a 2014 adaptation of the eponymous 2005 jukebox musical

Music
 Jersey Boy (1990), the 12th studio album by country artist Eddie Rabbitt
Jersey Boys: Original Broadway Cast Recording, an album of songs from the 2005 musical

See also
Jersey Girl (disambiguation)
Jersey Girls